Namarrói District is a district of Zambezia Province in Mozambique. The headquarters of the district is Namarrói.

Further reading
District profile (PDF)

Districts in Zambezia Province